Gundaris Pone (October 17, 1932 – March 15, 1994) was a Latvian-American composer of contemporary classical music, conductor, and professor.

Born in Riga, Latvia, he emigrated to the United States in 1950 after his fleeing the advancing Soviet troops, where he earned a doctorate in music from the University of Minnesota in 1962.

In 1963 he moved to New Paltz, New York, where he served as a professor at the State University College at New Paltz, New York. He was a winner of a Kennedy Center Friedheim Award (first place, 1982).

He died of cancer at the Benedictine Hospital in Kingston, New York on March 15, 1994, at the age of 61.  His wife was a concert pianist.  Pone and his wife had two children.  Adrian Pone, Born December 20, 1964, was a colonel and fighter pilot in the United States Air Force.  Adrian died in an auto accident on January 20, 2010.  His younger brother Daniel T. Pone resides in New York.

His notable students include Craig Fryer and David J. Sosnowski.  However, it is his former Theory and Composition student, Roberto Bolero Noriega, who would work with notable figures in popular music, including Michael Jackson, Whitney Houston, Madonna, and Julio Iglesias.

External links
Gundaris Pone obituary from ''The New York Times, 1994
Article about Gundaris Pone

1932 births
1994 deaths
20th-century classical composers
American male classical composers
American classical composers
Latvian emigrants to the United States
American male conductors (music)
Musicians from Riga
Latvian World War II refugees
University of Minnesota College of Liberal Arts alumni
New Paltz, New York
Deaths from cancer in New York (state)
20th-century American conductors (music)
20th-century American composers
20th-century American male musicians